The Pinacoteca di Brera ("Brera Art Gallery") is the main public gallery for paintings in Milan, Italy. It contains one of the foremost collections of Italian paintings from the 13th to the 20th century, an outgrowth of the cultural program of the Brera Academy, which shares the site in the Palazzo Brera.

History

The Palazzo Brera owes its name to the Germanic braida, indicating a grassy opening in the city structure: compare the Bra of Verona. The convent on the site passed to the Jesuits (1572), then underwent a radical rebuilding by Francesco Maria Richini (1627–28). When the Jesuits were disbanded in 1773, the palazzo remained the seat of the astronomical Observatory and the Braidense National Library founded by the Jesuits. In 1774 the herbarium of the new botanical garden was added. The buildings were extended to designs by Giuseppe Piermarini, who was appointed professor in the Academy when it was formally founded in 1776, with Giuseppe Parini as dean. Piermarini taught at the Academy for 20 years, while he was controller of the city's urbanistic projects, like the public gardens (1787–1788) and piazza Fontana (1780–1782).

For the better teaching of architecture, sculpture and the other arts, the Academy initiated by Parini was provided with a collection of casts after the Antique, an essential for inculcating a refined Neoclassicism in the students. Under Parini's successors, the abate Carlo Bianconi (1778–1802) and artist Giuseppe Bossi (1802–1807), the Academy acquired the first paintings of its Pinacoteca during the reassignment of works of Italian art that characterized the Napoleonic era. Raphael's Sposalizio (the Marriage of the Virgin) was the key painting of the early collection, and the Academy increased its cultural scope by taking on associates across the First French Empire: David, Pietro Benvenuti, Vincenzo Camuccini, Canova, Thorvaldsen and the archaeologist Ennio Quirino Visconti. 

In 1805, under Bossi's direction, the series of annual exhibitions was initiated with a system of prizes, a counterpart of the Paris Salons, which served to identify Milan as the cultural capital for contemporary painting in Italy through the 19th century. The Academy's artistic committee, the Commissione di Ornato exercised a controlling influence on public monuments, a precursor of today's Sopraintendenze Delle Belle Arti. 

The opening of the new "Reale Pinacoteca" was celebrated on 15 August 1809, Napoleon's birthday. The paintings were displayed in three of the four Napoleonic halls with pavilion vaults. Fundamental paintings by Bellini, Mantegna, Carpaccio, Titian, Veronese and Tintoretto had entered the gallery.

The Romantic era witnessed the triumph of academic history painting, guided at the Academy by Francesco Hayez, and the introduction of the landscape as an acceptable academic genre, inspired by Williamo's Davias and his more known cousin Giuseppe Bisi, while the Academy moved towards becoming an institution for teaching the history of art. 

In 1882, the Paintings Gallery was separated from the Academy and Giuseppe Bertini was appointed as its first director. Bertini was succeeded by Corrado Ricci who, during his direction from 1898-1903, established the Photo Library and systematically reorganized the Picture Gallery according to schools and periods. 

In 1903, the Pinacoteca opened 19 new rooms that allowed the exhibition of over 100 newly acquired works, such as Bramante's frescoes from the Visconti Panigarola house. The art historian and critic Antonio Morassi, who served as director at the Pinacoteca from 1934 to 1939, opened up the collection to 19th century painting and a new exhibition dominated by paintings by Hayez was created. There was also a precursory opening to the purchase of 20th century paintings, such as Guttuso's Portrait of Alberto Moravia and Mafai's "Modelli nello studio". 

The Brera Observatory hosted the astronomer Giovanni Schiaparelli for four decades, and the Orto Botanico di Brera is a historic botanical garden located behind the Pinacoteca. In 1939 during World War II, the works of the Pinacoteca were secured by the director Fernanda Wittgens, while the building suffered serious damage due to the bombings of 1943 (collapsed in twenty-six of the thirty-four sale). 

The Pinacoteca began its slow resurrection from the ruins in February 1946 thanks to the funding of some historic Milanese families, including the Bernocchi family, and to the work of the architect-designer Piero Portaluppi, Gualtiero Galmanini and the superintendent Fernanda Wittgens. Among the main acquisitions, it is worth mentioning the cycle of detached paintings from the oratory of Mocchirolo (14th century).

Gallery 

See List of Paintings of the Pinacoteca of Brera

See also 
 Collections of Pinacoteca di Brera
 Aldo Carpi
 Nativity with St Elizabeth and the Infant John the Baptist
 Madonna and Child with an Angel
 Portrait of Teresa Manzoni Stampa Borri

References

Further reading 
 [s.n.] (1823). Guida alle sale della pinacoteca e dei concorsi nell'I. R. palazzo delle scienze e belle arti (in Italian). Milano: per G.B. Bianchi e C.

External links

Brera Gallery official website 
Accademia di Brera official website

 
Tourist attractions in Milan
Culture in Milan
Art museums and galleries in Milan
1776 establishments in the Holy Roman Empire